Les toits de Collioure is a 1905 oil-on-canvas painting by Henri Matisse. It is an example of the style that Matisse employed during his early period of Fauvism. The painting has been in the collection of The Hermitage, St. Petersburg, Russia since 1948. It was originally part of the Sergei Shchukin collection, and then was at the State Museum of New Western Art in Moscow.

References

1905 paintings
Paintings by Henri Matisse
Paintings in Russia
Paintings in the collection of the Hermitage Museum
Water in art